Bigg Boss is an Indian reality show franchise based on the Dutch reality show Big Brother. It is produced by Endemol Shine India through Viacom18 and Disney Star. Subsequently, the various versions of the show are made internationally available through OTT platforms Voot and Disney+ Hotstar.

Bigg Boss was originally started in Hindi language and has been extended into seven languages spoken in the Indian sub-continent, including Kannada, Bengali, Tamil, Telugu, Marathi and Malayalam.

Overview
There have been seven versions of the show in different languages spoken in the Indian subcontinent. The first show of the franchise was Big Boss in Hindi which debuted in 2006 through Sony TV and from season two onwards it moved to and continues on Colors TV. In 2013, the franchise extended its presence in Kannada through Colors Kannada and Bengali through ETV Bangla, later rebranded into Colors Bangla. In 2017, it extend its presence in Tamil through Star Vijay and in Telugu through Star Maa. In 2018, it ventured into Marathi through Colors Marathi and in Malayalam through Asianet.

Though only celebrities were selected to be as housemates in the initial seasons, members of the general public have been chosen to be on the show in the latest seasons of Hindi, Kannada, Telugu, and Malayalam versions of the show.

Synopsis
Contestants called "housemates" live together in a specially constructed house that is isolated from the outside world. Housemates are voted out, usually on a weekly basis, until only one remains and wins the cash prize. During their stay in the house, contestants are continuously monitored by live television cameras as well as personal audio microphones.

The program relies on techniques such as a scripted back-to-basic environment, evictions, weekly tasks, competitions set by Bigg Boss, and the “confession room” where housemates converse with Bigg Boss and nominate the housemates they wish to evict from the house. The housemates with the most nominations are then announced, and viewers are given the opportunity to vote via SMS or online through social media and smartphone applications for the nominee they wish to save from eviction. The last person standing is declared the winner.

The contestants are required to indulge in housework and are assigned tasks by the omnipresent authority figure known to them as Bigg Boss. The tasks are designed to test teamwork abilities and community spirit of the housemates. The luxury budget is a weekly allowance to buy luxury food items other than the supplied essentials which depend on the outcome of assigned tasks.

History

Creation
Bigg Boss is a Hindi language adaptation of Big Brother created in Netherlands by John de Mol Jr., largely based on the Celebrity Big Brother model owned by the Endemol Shine Group. The show was named Bigg Boss and a house was constructed for the show at Lonavla for season one to four and six to twelve, in Karjat for season five and in Goregaon from season thirteen onwards. Bigg Boss debuted on television in 2006 through Sony TV with Arshad Warsi as the host. The show gained popularity after Shilpa Shetty emerged as the winner in Big Brother 5 and replaced Warsi as the host in the second season of Bigg Boss. From the second season, the show's broadcast moved to Viacom 18's Colors TV. For third season Amitabh Bachchan hosted the show respectively and Salman Khan continued as a host from fourth season onwards, while Sanjay Dutt also hosted for fifth season along with Salman Khan. Farah Khan hosted the spin off season of eighth season in absence of main host Salman Khan.

Expansion
The show's acceptance and success among the Indian audience paved way for its expansion into other Indian languages. After the sixth season wrapped in 2013, Kannada and Bengali adaptions were created by Endemol through ETV Network. Sudeep hosted Kannada version. Mithun Chakraborty and Jeet hosted Bengali version respectively. While the Kannada version continued with subsequent seasons annually, similar to Hindi, became an instant hit and the Bengali version completed only two seasons in six years and did not turn out to be as successful.

In 2017, upon completion of ten seasons in Hindi, four seasons in Kannada and two seasons in Bengali, Endemol Shine India extended its presence in South India by creating Tamil and Telugu versions of the show with Star India. The Tamil version was hosted by Kamal Haasan. While the Telugu version started with Jr NTR as a host, later for second season Nani replaced the host and from third season onwards Nagarjuna continued as a host respectively. In 2018, the show was adapted into Marathi under Viacom 18 and hosted by Mahesh Manjrekar. The next language adaptation was Malayalam, which was produced by Star India and hosted by Mohanlal. Later in 2021 another version was adopted called Bigg Boss OTT where its episodes were shown on Voot which is hosted by Karan Johar.

Versions
 Currently airing – 0
 Upcoming for airing – 1
 Recently concluded – 5
 No longer airing – 1

 Female Winners
 Male Winners

Summary

Bigg Boss Hindi 

Bigg Boss is the Hindi and the first version of the franchise. The first season premiered in 2006 on Sony TV It was hosted by Arshad Warsi. The prize money was  The license for Bigg Boss was acquired by Viacom 18 and the next season was aired on Colors TV with Shilpa Shetty as the host. Veteran actor Amitabh Bachchan was roped in to play host for the third season while Salman Khan appeared as the host in the fourth season. The fifth season was jointly hosted by Sanjay Dutt and Salman Khan while Khan alone continues to host the show consecutively since sixth season until present. A lavish purpose-built house, with annual modifications was built in Lonavala, Mumbai for the show. A new house was built at ND Studios in Karjat, Pune for the fifth season. The house at Lonavala was rebuilt and used again from the sixth season. The prize was reduced to  since the fifth season. A spin off series, Bigg Boss: Halla Bol was launched and merged into the eighth season with five finalists from the eighth season and five previous runner ups which was hosted by Farah Khan.

Atul Kapoor has been the voice of Bigg Boss since the first season.

Bigg Boss OTT (or Bigg Boss: Over-The-Top), a spin-off Indian Hindi-language reality digital series of the show Bigg Boss that aired exclusively on Viacom 18's streaming service platform Voot. The digital edition hosted by Karan Johar and the show premiered its first season on 8 August 2021.

Bigg Boss Kannada 

Bigg Boss Kannada is the Kannada version of the Bigg Boss reality TV show and it was the first south Indian adaption of Bigg Boss. Actor Sudeep was roped in by ETV Kannada to play the host of the show for the first season in 2013 and for second season Star India acquired the license of the show and aired on Suvarna with Sudeep continuing his role as the host of the show. The Bigg Boss house at Lonavala which was used for the Hindi version was also used for the first two seasons of Bigg Boss Kannada. A new and bigger house was constructed at Innovative Film City in Bidadi, Bengaluru and is being used since the third season. Sudeep's contract to host the show was extended to five seasons starting with the third season which returned to Viacom 18's Colors Kannada. The fifth season moved to Colors Super, a sister channel of Colors Kannada. It is notable that the Kannada version is the only adaption where the host, Sudeep alone would be hosting the show for nine consecutive seasons. All the seasons so far have had  as the prize money. Commoners were allowed to be a part of the show from the fifth season through auditions. Three artists have been the 'voice' of Bigg Boss as of fifth season - Amit Bhargav for the first two, B M Venkatesh for the third and Srinivas Prasad since the fourth season. 

Bigg Boss OTT (or Bigg Boss: Over-The-Top), a spin-off Indian Kannada-language reality digital series of the show Bigg Boss that aired exclusively on Viacom 18's streaming service platform Voot. The digital edition hosted by Sudeepa and the show premiered its first season on 6 August 2022.

Bigg Boss Bangla 

Bigg Boss Bangla is the Bengali version of the show which was produced by ETV Bangla with Mithun Chakraborty as the host while the first season of the Kannada version was wrapping up in 2013. The second season was aired on Colors Bangla in 2016 and was hosted by Bengali actor Jeet. This is the only adaption of the show that does not follow the annual format and the seasons have been produced once in 3 years. The reality show however has been discontinued after season 2 but a leading Bengali TV channel is planning to launch its new season and discussion about copyright issues is still on and show makers are yet to finalise it.

Bigg Boss Tamil 

Bigg Boss Tamil is the Tamil version of the show and the second south Indian adaption of Bigg Boss. Star India produced the show in 2017 with Kamal Haasan as the host on Star Vijay. This has been the only version to have none of its seasons shot at Lonavala. The house was constructed at EVP Film City, Chennai and is being used since the first season. All the three seasons so far have had  as the prize money. Halfway through season 5, the main host actor Kamal Haasan fell ill and was replaced by actress Ramya Krishnan to host the show until he recovered.

Bigg Boss Ultimate, a spin-off Indian Tamil-language reality digital series of the show Bigg Boss that aired exclusively on Disney Star's streaming service platform Disney+ Hotstar. The digital edition hosted by Kamal Haasan but later he replaced by Silambarasan and the show premiered its first season on 30 January 2022.

Bigg Boss Telugu 

Bigg Boss Telugu is the Telugu version of the Bigg Boss reality TV show and telecasted by Star Maa in 2017. The first season Jr NTR is being hosted the show and the Lonavala house was used for the show. The second season was hosted by Nani. From third season onwards Nagarjuna continued as a host for the show. Ramya Krishnan and Samantha Akkineni appeared as a guest host in Season 3 and Season 4 respectively in the absence of main host. From second season onwards a newly built house was constructed at Annapurna Studios, Hyderabad is being used for the show. The Three Seasons so far have had  as the prize money.

Bigg Boss Non-Stop, a spin-off Indian Telugu-language reality digital series of the show Bigg Boss that aired exclusively on Disney Star's streaming service platform Disney+ Hotstar. The digital edition hosted by Nagarjuna and the show premiered its first season on 26 February 2022.

Bigg Boss Marathi 

Bigg Boss Marathi is the Marathi version of the show and the first season is being aired on Viacom 18's Colors Marathi. The Lonavala house is being used for this version and Mahesh Manjrekar is playing the host. From the 2nd season onwards house is made in Goregaon flim city, Mumbai. This is the first and only adaption of Bigg Boss so far to have its language affiliation in the show's official name. The prize money is announced to be .

Bigg Boss Malayalam 

Bigg Boss Malayalam is the Malayalam adaptation of Bigg Boss, produced by Star India and broadcast on Asianet. Veteran actor Mohanlal has been roped to host the show and the Lonavala house was used for the first season. The prize money for the first season was announced to be ₹ 1 crore (US$140,000). All episodes of the show are available on the ott Disney+ Hotstar digital platform. The second and third season, house shifted to EVP Film City in Chennai. The fourth season onwards, the house being in Film City, Mumbai.

References 

 
Indian reality television series
Endemol Shine Group franchises
Indian television series based on non-Indian television series